Palmas Futebol e Regatas, or Palmas, as they are usually called, is a Brazilian football team from Palmas in Tocantins, founded on 31 January 1997. It competes in the Campeonato Tocantinense, the top flight of the Tocantins state football league.

Palmas is the top ranked team from Tocantins in CBF's national club ranking, being placed 88th overall.

History
Palmas Futebol e Regatas was founded on January 31, 1997, after borrowing Canelas documentation, which was already regularized at Tocantins Football Federation, thus, becoming the first professional club of the city. Tocantins Governor Siqueira Campos was the first person to sign the club's foundation minute.

On March 30, 1997, at Estádio General Sampaio, Porto Nacional, Belziran José de Souza scored the club's first goal. However, Palmas was beaten by Interporto 2-1.

In 1997, Palmas competed in the Campeonato Brasileiro Série C for the first time. The club was eliminated in the first stage.

On February 21, 2001, Palmas played its 100th match, against Gama, at Estádio Mané Garrincha, Brasília. Gama beat Palmas 1-0.

In 2004, the club was eliminated in Copa do Brasil quarterfinals, by 15 de Novembro. That was the club's best participation in the competition. 

On January 24, 2021, Palmas' special plane crashed on the way to Goiânia, killing the president of the club Lucas Meira, four footballers and the pilot.

Stadium
Palmas' home stadium is Estádio Nilton Santos, inaugurated in 2000, with a maximum capacity of 12,000 people.

Mascot
Palmas' mascot is a hyacinth macaw (Anodorhynchus hyacinthinus), wearing the club's away kit.

Current squad

First team

Club colors
The club colors are blue and white.

Honours
 Campeonato Tocantinense
 Winners (8): 2000, 2001, 2003, 2004, 2007, 2018, 2019, 2020

References

External links
 Palmas official website

 
Association football clubs established in 1997
Football clubs in Tocantins
1997 establishments in Brazil